Andrea Anastasi (born 8 October 1960) is an Italian professional volleyball coach and former player. He was a member of the Italy national team from 1981 to 1991. The 1990 World Champion, 1989 European Champion, and a two–time World League winner (1990, 1991). He currently serves as head coach for Sir Safety Perugia.

Career

As a player
Anastasi played 141 matches for the Italian national team. Anastasi winning the gained 1990 World Championship, 1989 European Championship, gold medalist of the 1990 World League and 1991 World League with Azzurri. Anastasi at club level first team in the Parma from 1977 to 1980. He with Modena, Falconara and Treviso won three CEV Challenge Cup.

As a coach
Anastasi started profession as a head coach with Brescia in 1994. Then from 1995 to 1999 coached Montichiari at Serie A1. In 1999, he was chosen as head coach of Italy. He achieved many success with Italian national team. He led the team to double gold in 1999 during the 1999 European Championship and 1999 FIVB World League. In 2000 he repeated success and won World league, in addition the achieved bronze medal at the 2000 Summer Olympics. in final Italy against Argentina (3-0) to reach bronze medals. Anastasi in the third year gained with Italy two silver medals at 2001 FIVB World League and 2001 European Championship. At 2002 FIVB World Championship Italy took fifth place along with Poland and United States. In the last year of coaching Italy, Anastasi gained with them bronze medal of 2003 FIVB World League and gold medal of the 2003 European Championship.

From 2003 to 2005, he was employed in the Italian Serie A League. Piemonte took fourth place twice and won 2005 Italian Cup.

Then Anastasi moved to coaching Spain. In 2007 European Championship he led Spanish to historic title of European Champions held in Moscow. Spain beat hosts in the finale and made 15 victories in a row. Received Silver medal in Mediterranean Games his latest achievement.

In 2007 Anastasi came back to work with Italy. However, this time without many success (4th place at the 2008 Summer Olympics, 10th place at the European Championship and 4th place at the 2010 World Championship). He was fired in 2010.

Poland after bad year 2010 decided to change a head coach and squad. Andrea Anastasi began work as head coach on February 23, 2011, when Poland was ranked 11th in the FIVB ranking. His assistant was Andrea Gardini. 2011 was very successful for Anastasi and his team. On July 10, 2011, Poland won first medal of the World League in history. Then on September 18, 2011, Poland beat Russia (3–1) and achieved their second bronze in 2011. Polish national team qualified to the Olympics on December 3, 2011. Anastasi led Poland to silver medal of the 2011 FIVB World Cup. For the first time in the history Polish national team won three medals in one year. In next year on July 8, 2012, won the final match of 2012 FIVB World League against United States (3-0).
At 2012 Olympic Games his team took 5th place. In October 2013 Andrea Anastasi was fired as coach of the Polish national team. The reason for this decision were unsuccessful Polish losses in 2013 and getting worse team game. Poland, while working of Andrea Anastasi, took 3rd place in the FIVB World Rankings.

In June 2014, the Andrea Anastasi was officially presented as the Lotos Trefl Gdańsk new head coach. Team took 3rd place in regular season of PlusLiga and winner 2014–15 Polish Cup. His team won 19 and lost 7 matches. On February 23, 2015, Andrea Anastasi signed new two-years contract, because of good results in regular, season till 2017. LOTOS Trefl advanced to the final of 2014–15 PlusLiga after winning in semifinal. It was the first, historical promotion  of LOTOS Trefl to the final of Polish Championship and Anastasi led the team to silver medal of 2015 Polish Championship.

On March 14, 2018, Anastasi extended his contract with Polish club Trefl Gdańsk and became a new head coach of Belgium.

Honours

As a player
 CEV Challenge Cup
  1982/1983 – with Panini Modena
  1985/1986 – with Pallavolo Falconara
  1990/1991 – with Sisley Treviso

As a coach
 FIVB Club World Championship
  Betim 2022 – with Sir Safety Perugia

 National championships
 2014/2015  Polish Cup, with Lotos Trefl Gdańsk
 2015/2016  Polish SuperCup, with Lotos Trefl Gdańsk
 2017/2018  Polish Cup, with Lotos Trefl Gdańsk
 2022/2023  Italian SuperCup, with Sir Safety Perugia

Individual awards
 2000: Coach of the Year in Italy
 2011: Coach of the Year in Poland
 2012: Coach of the Year in Poland

References

External links

 
 
 Coach profile at LegaVolley.it 
 Player profile at LegaVolley.it 
 Coach/Player profile at Volleybox.net

1960 births
Living people
Sportspeople from the Province of Mantua
Italian men's volleyball players
Italian volleyball coaches
Volleyball coaches of international teams
Italian expatriate sportspeople in Spain
Italian expatriate sportspeople in Poland
Italian expatriate sportspeople in Belgium
Trefl Gdańsk coaches
Projekt Warsaw coaches